Chernopeev Peak is the rocky peak rising to 543 m on the southeast side of Cugnot Ice Piedmont on Trinity Peninsula in Graham Land, Antarctica.

The peak is named after Hristo Chernopeev (Chernyo Peev, 1868-1915), a leader of the Bulgarian liberation movement in Macedonia.

Location
German-British mapping in 1996.

Maps
 Trinity Peninsula. Scale 1:250000 topographic map No. 5697. Institut für Angewandte Geodäsie and British Antarctic Survey, 1996.
 Antarctic Digital Database (ADD). Scale 1:250000 topographic map of Antarctica. Scientific Committee on Antarctic Research (SCAR), 1993–2016.

References
 Chernopeev Peak. SCAR Composite Antarctic Gazetteer.
 Bulgarian Antarctic Gazetteer. Antarctic Place-names Commission. (details in Bulgarian, basic data in English)

External links
 Chernopeev Peak. Copernix satellite image

Mountains of Trinity Peninsula
Bulgaria and the Antarctic